Martin Čotar (born 10 July 1977 in Pazin) is a Croatian cyclist. He is a five-time national time trial champion and two time national road race champion. His sporting career began with Sava Kranj.

Major results

1996
 1st  National Road Race Championships
1997
 2nd National Time Trial Championships
1998
 2nd National Road Race Championships
1999
 1st  World Military Time Trial Championhsips
 1st  U23 European Time Trial Championships
 1st  National Road Race Championships
 1st  National Time Trial Championships
2000
 1st  National Time Trial Championships
2001
 1st  National Time Trial Championships
 9th Overall Bayern Rundfahrt
2002
 1st  National Time Trial Championships
 2nd National Road Race Championships
 3rd Overall The Paths of King Nikola
1st Stage 1
2005
 1st  National Time Trial Championships
2008
 3rd National Time Trial Championships

References

1977 births
Living people
Croatian male cyclists
People from Pazin